Kaggere is the name of three separate villages in southern Karnataka of south India.

Tumkur district 
One Kaggere is in Tumkur district. It is located along NH 48, near by Yedeyur, Kaggere is the place where Shri Siddalingeshwara Swamy had performed penance (Thapasya) for 12 years.

Hassan district 
Another Kaggere is in Hassan District, Channarayapattana Taluck, this village has famous Shiva's temples "Kalleshwara" and "Gangadareshwara" temples. Kalleshwara temple hanuman temple is treated as one of the Panchalinga in Channarayapattana Taluck.

Mysore district 
One more Kaggere village is in Mysore district, KR Nagara Taluck.

References 

Villages in Tumkur district